Ruth Williams-Simpson (born 19 October 1949) is a Jamaican sprinter. She competed in the 400 metres at the 1972, 1976 and the 1980 Summer Olympics. She won a bronze medal in the 4 x 400 metres relay at the 1971 Pan American Games.

References

1949 births
Living people
Athletes (track and field) at the 1972 Summer Olympics
Athletes (track and field) at the 1976 Summer Olympics
Athletes (track and field) at the 1980 Summer Olympics
Jamaican female sprinters
Olympic athletes of Jamaica
Athletes (track and field) at the 1971 Pan American Games
Athletes (track and field) at the 1975 Pan American Games
Pan American Games bronze medalists for Jamaica
Pan American Games medalists in athletics (track and field)
Athletes (track and field) at the 1974 British Commonwealth Games
Athletes (track and field) at the 1978 Commonwealth Games
Commonwealth Games competitors for Jamaica
Place of birth missing (living people)
Central American and Caribbean Games medalists in athletics
Central American and Caribbean Games silver medalists for Jamaica
Competitors at the 1978 Central American and Caribbean Games
Medalists at the 1971 Pan American Games
Olympic female sprinters
20th-century Jamaican women